Rhyacionia insulariana is a species of moth of the family Tortricidae. It is found in China (Sichuan, Yunnan).

The larvae feed on Pinus yunnanensis, Pinus densata, Pinus kesiya var. langbianensis, Pinus armandi and Pinus massoniana.

References

Moths described in 1981
Eucosmini